Ligia Consuelo Bonetti Dubreil or Ligia Bonetti de Valiente (born 27 March 1968 in Santo Domingo) is a businesswoman from the Dominican Republic. She is chairperson and CEO of Grupo SID since January 2015.

Bonetti attended the Carol Morgan School in Santo Domingo.

She was President of the National Association of Young Entrepreneurs (ANJE). In 1999, she was admitted as a Dame of the Sovereign Military Order of Malta.

External links 
 Website Grupo SID

References 

Living people
1968 births
People from Santo Domingo
Dominican Republic people of Breton descent
Dominican Republic people of Canarian descent
Dominican Republic people of Catalan descent
Dominican Republic people of French descent
Dominican Republic people of Italian descent
Dominican Republic people of Quechua descent
Wheaton College (Massachusetts) alumni
Wharton School of the University of Pennsylvania alumni
Dominican Republic chairpersons of corporations
Women chief executives
Dames of Malta
People of Ligurian descent